William Anstey Giles (29 June 1860 – 7 May 1944), generally known as Anstey Giles, was a surgeon and medical administrator in Adelaide, South Australia.

Early life and education
Giles was born in Adelaide on 29 June 1860, the eldest son of Thomas Giles (1820–1899) and  Mary Giles, née O'Halloran (c. 1839 – 1 October 1915). He was a grandson of William Giles (1791–1862) second manager of the South Australian Company. Mary was a daughter of Captain William Littlejohn O'Halloran (c. 1805 – 15 July 1885), Auditor-General of South Australia.

Giles was educated at Clifton College in Bristol and studied Medicine at the University of Edinburgh, graduating in 1882.

He then spent two years in Vienna, studying diseases of the ear, nose and throat under Dr. Ádám Politzer amongst others, returning to Adelaide in 1885. His MB degree was accepted ad eundem gradum by the University of Adelaide in 1886.

Career
Giles entered into private practice with Dr. William Gardner, a partnership that was to last many years. Both doctors sent patients to and were associated with the Private Hospital, Wakefield Street, the first training hospital for nurses in the state.

He was appointed lecturer in otology by the University of Adelaide in 1886, resigning in 1905.

During his public career he served as:
Secretary of the Medical Board 1890 to 1896
Honorary surgeon at the Adelaide Hospital from 1891 to 1908
Honorary surgeon of the ear department from 1891 to 1896
Lecturer in clinical surgery from 1882 to 1896 and from 1902 to 1907
Foundation member of the Australian College of Surgeons and the first president of the South Australian branch.
Dean of the Faculty of Medicine at the Adelaide University in 1895 and again from 1902 to 1904
Lecturer in clinical surgery at the Adelaide Hospital from 1892 to 1896 and from 1902 to 1907.
He was a member of the Adelaide Hospital Board of Management, which was sacked by the Kingston Government in 1896. The hospital was riven by professional jealousies and a dysfunctional workplace, and came to a head when E. Willis Way, no friend of Kingston, was accused of nepotism for promoting his daughter Bessie to Charge Nurse.

Giles retired from most professional obligations shortly after The Great War.

Other interests
He was a foundation member of the Royal Adelaide Golf Club

Recognition
Giles is commemorated with a bronze plaque on North Terrace, Adelaide.
The annual Anstey Giles lecture was established in 1953 by the SA committee of the Royal Australasian College of Surgeons.

Family
Giles married Rita Jones ( – 9 September 1907) of "Brocklesby", Melbourne, on 1 July 1891. Their only child died a few days after birth in 1892. They had a home on Barnard Street, North Adelaide.

References 

Australian surgeons
Australian hospital administrators
1860 births
1944 deaths